The Objectivity of the Sociological and Social-Political Knowledge, known also as [The] "Objectivity" [of Knowledge] in Social Science and Social Policy, is a 1904 essay written by Maximilian Weber, a German economist and sociologist, originalpublished in German in the 1904 issues of the Archiv für Sozialwissenschaft und Sozialforschung. Various translations to English exist.

The objectivity essay discusses essential concepts of Weber's sociology: "ideal type," "(social) action," "empathic understanding," "imaginary experiment," "value-free analysis," and "objectivity of sociological understanding".

With his objectivity essay, Weber pursued two goals. On the one hand, he wanted to outline the research program of the Archiv für Sozialwissenschaft und Sozialforschung from his point of view, in particular its position on the question of non-judgmental science. On the other hand, Weber dealt with the question of how objectively valid truths are possible in the field of cultural sciences.

See also

Sociology

References

External links
 Online ebook
Excerpts on Google Books
Online ebook Link Broken

Sociology essays
Essays by Max Weber
1904 essays